The following is a list of wars involving Mozambique.

Notes 

Wars involving Mozambique
Mozambique
Wars